In Line of Duty is a 1931 American Western film directed by Bert Glennon and starring Sue Carol, Noah Beery and Francis McDonald. It was one of the earliest releases of Trem Carr's Monogram Pictures.<ref>American Film Institute p.128</ref> It is now considered a lost film.

Synopsis
A Canadian Mountie officer pursuing a fugitive from the law, is left in a moral conundrum when the fugitive saves his life.

Cast
 Sue Carol as Felice Duchene  
 Noah Beery as Jean Duchene  
 Francis McDonald as Jacques Dupres  
 James Murray as Cpl. Sherwood  
 Richard Cramer as Hugh Fraser  
 Frank Seider as Constable  
 Henry Hall as Inspector

References

Bibliography
 American Film Institute Catalog: Feature Films, 1931-1940, Volumes 1-3''. University of California Press, 1993.

External links
 

1931 films
1931 Western (genre) films
American Western (genre) films
Monogram Pictures films
Films directed by Bert Glennon
Lost American films
American black-and-white films
Lost Western (genre) films
Royal Canadian Mounted Police in fiction
Northern (genre) films
1931 lost films
1930s English-language films
1930s American films